Banga Bhushan is a title instituted by the West Bengal Government to honour the services of personalities in various fields.

List of awardees

2022

2014

2013

2012

See also
Banga Bibhushan

References

Civil awards and decorations of West Bengal